Debasish Samantray (born 10 September 1996) is an Indian cricketer. He made his Twenty20 debut for Odisha in the 2017–18 Zonal T20 League on 8 January 2018. He made his first-class debut for Odisha in the 2018–19 Ranji Trophy on 14 December 2018. He made his List A debut on 12 October 2019, for Odisha in the 2019–20 Vijay Hazare Trophy.

References

External links
 

1996 births
Living people
Indian cricketers
Odisha cricketers
People from Dhenkanal
Cricketers from Odisha